Čab is a village and municipality in the Nitra District in western central Slovakia, in the Nitra Region.

History
In historical records the village was first mentioned in 1326.

Geography
The village lies at an altitude of 154 metres and covers an area of 8.155 km². It has a population of about 710 people.

Ethnicity
The village is approximately 100% Slovak.

Facilities
The village has a public library.

See also
 List of municipalities and towns in Slovakia

References

Genealogical resources

The records for genealogical research are available at the state archive "Statny Archiv in Nitra, Slovakia"

 Roman Catholic church records (births/marriages/deaths): 1827-1896 (parish B)

External links
http://www.statistics.sk/mosmis/eng/run.html
Surnames of living people in Cab

Villages and municipalities in Nitra District